Schenkman is a surname. Notable people with the surname include:

Byron Schenkman (born 1966), American musician, music director and educator
Jan Schenkman (1806–1863), Dutch teacher, poet and writer
Joe Schenkman (born 1947), American publisher and cartoonist
Richard Schenkman (born 1958), American screenwriter, film producer, film director and actor
Alfred Schenkman (born 1921–1998), American publisher, Unitarian Minister, founder Schenkman books USA
Edgar Schenkman (born 1908–1993), American conductor and violist, Conductor Richmond Symphony Orchestra, hobby farmer
Marguerite Quarles Schenkman (born 1910–2003), American violinist
Peter Q. Schenkman (born 1937–2006), American cellist, Boston Symphony Orchestra 1963–1964,St.louis Symphony 1964–1965, Principal cellist Toronto Symphony Orchestra 1967-1972
Eric Lyons Schenkman (born 1963), American guitarist/singer/songwriter, founder musical group Spin Doctors   
Bo Schenkman (born 1948), Swedish scientist